Joshua First is an American historian. He is a specialist in the history of Russia and Ukraine during the 20th and 21st centuries.

He has a Ph.D. in History from the University of Michigan.

Books
Ukrainian Cinema: Belonging and Identity during the Soviet Thaw (2014)
Sergei Paradjanov: Shadows of Forgotten Ancestors (2016)

References

American historians
Year of birth missing (living people)
Living people
Place of birth missing (living people)
University of Michigan alumni